Military Families Against the War (MFAW) is an organisation of families of servicemen in the United Kingdom created to campaign for British troops to be withdrawn from Iraq.

The group's mission statement sets out their objectives as follows:

A number of member families have recently launched an application for a judicial review under the Human Rights Act 1998, which if successful will open the way for a fully independent public enquiry into the Iraq war and would see senior ministers including Tony Blair called to face cross-examination.

See also 
 Opposition to the Iraq War
 List of anti-war organizations
 List of peace activists

Opposition to the Iraq War
Criticisms of wars
Anti-war protests